Ian Robertson may refer to:

Sports 
 Ian Robertson (rugby union, born 1945), Scottish rugby union player and commentator 
 Ian Robertson (Australian rules footballer) (born 1946), football commentator and former Australian rules footballer
 Ian Robertson (rugby union, born 1951) (born 1951), Australian rugby union player
 Ian Robertson (rugby union, born 1950) (1950–2015), South African rugby union player
 Ian Robertson (footballer, born 1966), Scottish former football player
 Ian Robertson (Gaelic footballer) (fl. 1993–2004), Irish Gaelic football player
 Ian Robertson (Scottish footballer), Scottish footballer

Others 
 Ian Robertson, Lord Robertson (1912–2005), Senator of the College of Justice in Scotland
 Ian Robertson (British Army officer) (1913–2010), British general
 Ian Robertson (Royal Navy officer) (1922–2012), British admiral
 Ian Robertson Porteous (1930–2011), Scottish mathematician
 Ian Robertson (businessman) (born 1958), English automotive executive working for the BMW Group
 Ian Robertson (psychologist) (born 1951), Scottish professor of psychology at Trinity College, Dublin